Rock of Gibraltar (8 March 1999 – 23 October 2022) was an Irish Thoroughbred racehorse who won seven times at Group 1, including the 2000 Guineas and Irish 2,000 Guineas in 2002. He was at stud in Ireland during the Northern Hemisphere breeding season and in Australia as a Shuttle stallion

Background
Rock of Gibraltar was sired by the leading sire Danehill. He was named after the Rock of Gibraltar, a monolithic limestone promontory in Gibraltar on the southern tip of the Iberian Peninsula.

Racing career

2001
In April 2001 he won on his first outing as a two-year-old at the Curragh in Ireland and followed up with a 6th place at Ascot in England in June followed by another first place at the Curragh in July. Later in the year he had four further outings – winning at York and Newmarket in England, Longchamp Racecourse in France and finishing second back in England at Doncaster.  For the 2021 season he was partnered by Irish jockey M. J. Kinnane and had won six times (two Group 1, three Group 2 and a Maiden).

2002
As a three-year-old he won his first race in 2002 at Newmarket, following up with four straight wins at the Curragh, Ascot, Goodwood and Longchamp. His final race was a second place in the United States at Arlington. The 2002 wins meant that he achieved the record of winning seven consecutive Group 1 races in the Northern Hemisphere.

Trainer
The horse was trained by Aidan O'Brien at Ballydoyle Stables, Co. Tipperary, Ireland. O'Brien also bred him in partnership with his wife Anne-Marie and father-in-law Joe Crowley. Over the course of two seasons, Rock of Gibraltar won seven consecutive Group 1 wins before finishing second to Domedriver in the 2002 Breeders' Cup Mile. He was voted the 2002 European Horse of the Year.

Ownership
For much of his racing career, Rock of Gibraltar ran in the colours of Manchester United manager Sir Alex Ferguson, who was named as a part-owner along with Susan Magnier, wife of Coolmore owner John Magnier. Upon Rock of Gibraltar's retirement, Ferguson and John Magnier were involved in a dispute over the exact nature of the ownership of the horse. The dispute was settled out of court.

Stud career
Amongst Rock of Gibraltar's offspring were Hong Kong Cup winner and Epsom Derby runner-up Eagle Mountain, and Group One winners Samitar, Seventh Rock, Mount Nelson, Varenar, and Society Rock.

Race record

Source:

Pedigree

 Rock of Gibraltar is inbred 3 × 3 to Northern Dancer. This also means that Rock of Gibraltar is inbred to Nearctic and Natalma 4 x 4, however like all of Danehill's offspring Rock of Gibraltar is inbred 4 × 4 to the mare Natalma. As a result of this Rock of Gibraltar is inbred 4 × 4 x 4 to Natalma.

References

Explanatory notes

External links
 Rock of Gibraltar Career 1-2-3 Colour Chart

1999 racehorse births
2000 Guineas winners
2022 racehorse deaths
Alex Ferguson
Irish Classic Race winners
Racehorses bred in Ireland
Racehorses trained in Ireland
Thoroughbred family 10-a
European Thoroughbred Horse of the Year